"Tribe" is a song by American rappers Bas and J. Cole. It was released on August 22, 2018, as the second single for Bas's album Milky Way. The song was produced by Childish Major with additional production from J. Cole, and contains a sample of "Zum Zum" performed by Edu Lobo.

Background
On August 18, Bas was on Instagram live previewing songs from his album, which was due on August 24. One of the snippets was from "Tribe" showcasing "an up-tempo, percussive instrumental," and later revealing the release date of the single. The song is ninth collaboration between the two Dreamville artists, including "My Nigga Just Made Bail", "Lit" and "Night Job", among others. When talking about J. Cole helping with the post-production of the song, Bas said:

Music video
The music video for the song was released on August 21. The video was shot in Miami's Little Haiti neighborhood. Sidney Madden of NPR said, "like the song's message, the video celebrates the timing of life's blessings."

In other media
The song "Tribe" was featured on the soundtrack to 2018 video game FIFA 19.

Charts

Certifications

References 

2018 songs
J. Cole songs
Songs written by J. Cole
Song recordings produced by J. Cole
2018 singles